The University of Palestine (UP) is a Palestinian private institution of higher education located in Al-Zahra' (south of Gaza City). The university was established in 2005.

Each specialization has a supervisory committee of lecturers. There is an IT unit responsible for organizing communication between lecturers and students through the UPINAR Revision and the UPINAR Office Hour, using a technological program developed by these university teams.

The University of Palestine offers an open access repository for scholarly output by research centers, faculty staff and students, as well as a published Arabic Lightweight OpenCourseWare

References

External links
Official website
Official website in English

Educational institutions established in 2005
2005 establishments in the Palestinian territories
Universities and colleges in Gaza Strip